The 1934 Texas Mines Miners football team, sometimes known as the "Muckers", was an American football team that represented Texas School of Mines (now known as the University of Texas at El Paso) as an independent during the 1934 college football season. In its sixth season under head coach Mack Saxon, the team compiled a 4–4 record and outscored opponents by a total of 132 to 104.

The school celebrated its 20th anniversary in 1934 and held a parade through El Paso in connection with the October 13 football game.

Schedule

References

Texas Mines
UTEP Miners football seasons
Texas Mines Miners football